Ukrainsky is a rural locality (a settlement) in Aleksandrovsky Selsoviet, Suyetsky District, Altai Krai, Russia. The population was 151 as of 2013. There are 3 streets.

Geography 
Ukrainsky is located 13 km southeast of Verkh-Suyetka (the district's administrative centre) by road. Aleksandrovka is the nearest rural locality.

References 

Rural localities in Suyetsky District